The Keningau District is an administrative district in the Malaysian state of Sabah, part of the Interior Division which includes the districts of Beaufort, Keningau, Kuala Penyu, Nabawan, Sipitang, Tambunan and Tenom. The capital of the district is in Keningau Town.

Etymology 
The name Keningau is derived from the locally-abundant Javanese cinnamon tree (Cinnamomum burmannii) which is locally known as Koningau.

History 
Keningau was one of the most important administrative centres for the British North Borneo in the early years of the 20th century. The Japanese also used Keningau as a government centre during their occupation in the Second World War. The village of Nuntunan near Apin-Apin was numbered "44" in the British administration. The number stated the distance about 44 kilometres from Tenom. Nuntunan was also called the "Office" because the British administration building was on the banks of the Apin-apin River. The Japanese took over the building for their own administration during the occupation.

Geography 
The district of Keningau covers an area of 3,533 square kilometres and is located in a valley bordered to the west by the Crocker Range and to the south and east by the Mount Trus Madi.

Demographics 

The population of the district of Keningau is 173,103 according to the last census in 2010. It consists of 90% of Dusun and Murut, as well an estimate of 8% Hakka Chinese population and various minority indigenous groups.

Gallery

See also 
 Districts of Malaysia

References

Further reading

External links 

  Keningau District Council
  Keningau District Office